Roland Weber (3 March 1909 – 14 October 1997) was a German landscape architect.

Life 
Weber was born in Düsseldorf as the son of the self-employed engineer Karl Weber and his wife Agnes.
In 1933, he graduated as a garden technician. Weber then worked again at the Jürgl nursery, now as head of the planning department.

His first commission as a freelance garden architect was the landscape garden of the Haus Christiansen on the Elbchaussee in Altona an der Elbe in 1934 (arch. ).

In 1936 he founded his own office in Rodenkirchen. During the Second World War, Weber was drafted for military service, which he performed as a medic in Russia, among other places.

After the war, Weber moved with his office to Düsseldorf, where he created numerous public and private gardens.

Weber was intensively involved with the garden art of other cultures. In 1978, for example, he travelled to southern Spain to study Moorish architecture and garden art such as the gardens of the Generalife in the Alhambra. He also travelled to countries on other continents, such as Morocco, Iran, Thailand and Japan. 

Weber lived alone and in seclusion; he died in 1997 at the age of 88 from the late effects of a fire accident in his own house. His grave is in the Linnep cemetery in Ratingen-Breitscheid. The architect Helmut Hentrich, who was a friend of his, created his gravestone. His office continues as WKM Landschaftsarchitekten Weber Klein Maas.

Gardens 

 1934: Landschaftsgarten Haus Christiansen an der Elbchaussee in Hamburg-Altona (architect: Rudolf Lodders)
 1936: Private Garden in  near Bonn
 1937: Hausgarten Sch. in Marienburg (Köln).
 before 1950: Garten B. in Düsseldorf.
 before 1950: Garten H. in Düsseldorf (with ).
 1952–53: Eigener Landschaftsgarten Haus Weber in Düsseldorf-Kalkum, An der alten Mühle 5.
 ca. 1954: Malkastenpark
 1952–55: Hausgarten in Krefeld
 before 1960: Landhausgarten im Birkenhain (architekt: Hans Junghanns).
 1954–68: Garden Langen in Meerbusch
 1954: Garden courtyard of a private house in Düsseldorf
 1955–57: Renker country estate in the Voreifel in Düren-Fuchsbenden
 1957: Exhibition garden for the Bundesgartenschau 1957 in Cologne
 1960–61: Outdoor facilities of the former casino R 55, Bayer-Werk Uerdingen, Krefeld (under monument protection)
 1961–95: Außenanlagen der , Am Seestern, Düsseldorf.
 1965: Exhibition garden for the 1965 Federal Horticultural Show in Essen.
 1965–74: Green space planning for the 
 1967: Inner courtyard of Koerfer House in Moscia, Ascona, Ticino (architect: Marcel Breuer)
 1968–74: Garden courtyard at Fritz-Henkel-Haus (seminar building) of Henkel KGaA, Düsseldorf
 1969–75: Landscape garden Frowein in Wuppertal
 1974–92: Outdoor facilities at the headquarters of TÜV Rheinland, Cologne
 1978: Garden courtyard of a private house in Düsseldorf
 1978: Garden courtyard at the headquarters of TÜV Rheinland, Cologne
 1978: Parks of the Kasteel Groot Buggenum in Grathem, Limburg, Netherlands for Helmut Hentrich.
 1982:  AG (today Vodafone), in Düsseldorf-Carlstadt, Mannesmannufer.
 1982: Garden courtyard south of the head office of Deutsche Bank AG, Düsseldorf
 1984–86: Garden in Düsseldorf-Oberkassel
 1988–90: Gardens for the new head office building of Horten AG, Am Albertussee, Düsseldorf
 1990–92: Renovation of the historic palace garden of Horten AG, Am Albertussee, Horten AG Schloss Landsberg (Ratingen) Breitscheid

Exhibitions 
 Exhibition together with the architect Hans Junghanns in the Düsseldorf City Museum, November 1983 to January 1984.
 Exhibition "Roland Weber – Die Kunst des Gartens" im Schloss Benrath (Düsseldorf), July/August 2004

References

Further reading 
 
 
  (in the same time, dissertation for the Heinrich Heine University Düsseldorf, 2004).
 

1909 births
1997 deaths
German landscape architects
Artists from Düsseldorf